Jakob Martin Pettersen (11 April 1899 – 8 February 1970) was a Norwegian politician for the Labour Party and Minister of Transport and Communications 1952–1955.

Born in Bergen to a factory worker and his wife, Pettersen studied chemistry at Bergen tekniske skole (now part of Bergen University College). He started working in Odda in 1921; from 1924 to 1945 he worked as a chemist at Odda Smelteverk.

In 1928, he became a member of the municipal council of Odda and he served as vice-mayor from 1932 to 1940. He was elected mayor in 1945 and held the position to 1947.

He was elected to the Parliament of Norway in 1945 and served to 1965; from 1959 as vice-president of Odelstinget. From 1952 to 1955, he was Minister of Transport and Communications.

He held leadership and other elected positions in several temperance organisations.

References 

1899 births
1970 deaths
Government ministers of Norway
Members of the Storting
Labour Party (Norway) politicians
Ministers of Transport and Communications of Norway
Bergen University College alumni
20th-century Norwegian politicians